Elania Nardelli (born 7 July 1987) is an Italian sport shooter. Born in Foggia, she competed in the women's 10 metre air rifle and women's 50 metre rifle three positions events at the 2012 Summer Olympics. Nardelli is an athlete of the Gruppo Sportivo della Marina Militare.

References

External links
 

1987 births
Living people
Italian female sport shooters
Olympic shooters of Italy
Shooters at the 2012 Summer Olympics
Sportspeople from Foggia
Shooters of Marina Militare